U.S. Crush is the sole album by the American punk rock band, U.S. Crush. It was released April 11, 2000, on Immortal Records/Virgin Records.

Track listing
 "Bleed" (2:43)
 "Jimmie Crack Rock" (2:56)
 "Debutante" (2:28)
 "Loser" (3:12)
 "Stand Up" (3:24)
 "Underground" (3:14)
 "Same Old Story (She's So Pretty)" (2:58)
 "You Wanna Be a Star" (2:32)
 "Collision Course" (3:15)
 "First Time" (3:51)
 "Everything" (3:01)
 "Destroy" (2:23)
 "Out of Control" (3:13)
 "So I Thought" (9:30)

Personnel
 Denny Lake - vocals
 Hodgie Haynes - guitar
 David Hanson - guitar
 Ky Lambert - bass
 Dennis Wolfe - drums

References

U.S. Crush albums
2000 debut albums
Immortal Records albums
Virgin Records albums
Albums recorded at Sound City Studios